Jean-François Remésy (born 5 June 1964), also known as Jeff Remésy, is a French professional golfer.

Career
Remésy was born in Nîmes, Occitania. He won the French Amateur Championship in 1985 and turned professional in 1987. For much of his career he has struggled to establish himself as a tour golfer, and he has made over a dozen trips to the European Tour Qualifying School. His first professional win came in a small tournament in France in 1991 and he won on the Challenge Tour in 1994, but he didn't break into the top 100 on the European Tour Order of Merit until 1999. That year he won the Estoril Open on the main tour, and he has continued to progress since then. In 2004 he became the first Frenchman to win the Open de France in 35 years, and in 2005 he retained his title by beating fellow Frenchman Jean van de Velde in a playoff. He lost his card in 2008 after a poor season and went to qualifying school for the 13th time but was not able to earn his tour card for 2009. His best finish on the European Tour Order of Merit came in 2004 when he finished in 19th with €1,083,360.

Since turning 50, Remésy has played senior golf on the European Senior Tour and the PGA Tour Champions. On the PGA Tour Champions his best result was to be tied for 4th place in the 2016 American Family Insurance Championship. In 2018 he won the Swiss Seniors Open, his first win on the European Senior Tour.

Amateur wins
1985 French Amateur Championship

Professional wins (13)

European Tour wins (3)

European Tour playoff record (1–1)

Challenge Tour wins (1)

Alps Tour wins (3)

French Tour wins (1)

Other wins (3)
1991 Challenge AGF (France)
1994 Vittel Open (France)
1999 French PGA Championship

European Senior Tour wins (2)

European Senior Tour playoff record (0–1)

Results in major championships

Note: Remésy never played in the Masters Tournament nor the U.S. Open.

CUT = Missed the half-way cut
"T" = tied

Results in World Golf Championships

"T" = Tied

Team appearances
Amateur
European Amateur Team Championship (representing France): 1985
Eisenhower Trophy (representing France): 1986
 
Professional
Alfred Dunhill Cup (representing France): 1999, 2000
World Cup (representing France): 1999
Seve Trophy (representing Continental Europe): 2005

References

External links

French male golfers
European Tour golfers
European Senior Tour golfers
PGA Tour Champions golfers
Sportspeople from Nîmes
People from Martigny
1964 births
Living people